Delhi Public School Servodaya Nagar, Kanpur is a private school running under the aegis of Delhi Public School Society, New Delhi. It is a Primary School having classes from Play Group to Class V. It serves as the junior wing of Delhi Public School, Azaad Nagar, Kanpur. DPS Servodaya Nagar is located in the heart of the city near J. K. Temple, a prominent landmark of the city.

Overview 

Delhi Public School Servodaya Nagar was established in the year 1997. It was the first Delhi Public School in the city of Kanpur. DPS Servodaya Nagar functions under the supervision and guidance of its Head Mistress, Mrs. Pratibha Shukla. Moreover, DPS Azaad Nagar (under the aegis of Delhi Public School Society, New Delhi and affiliated to CBSE, New Delhi) was established in the year 2004 as the senior and full-fledged wing of DPS Servodaya Nagar.
DPS Servodaya Nagar is a co - educational day school with more than 600 students. The school provides air-conditioned classrooms for its Pre Primary classes. DPS Servodaya Nagar's infrastructure consists of, Swimming pool, Discovery room, a Mini Zoo, Computer Lab and a playground. For non-formal education, the school conducts classesfor music, dance, art, theatrics, public speaking etc.

Activities 

Republic Day Celebration

Delhi Public School, Servodaya Nagar salutes the nation on the eve of its 69th Independence Day.

Jashn-e-bachpan - Annual Concert

Jashn – E – Bachpan is the annual concert organized by DPS Servodaya Nagar. It is a platform for the students to present social awareness and understanding of diverse cultures & religion through music and dance.

Our Shining Star - Annual Award Ceremony

D.P.S Servodaya Nagar concluded its academic session 2013-14 with an Award Ceremony " Our Shining Stars" in its premises on 24th is organized each year to acknowledge, build confidence and to motivate the young achievers by presenting the deserving students with awards for their hard work and dedication shown during the year.

See also 
 Delhi Public School Society
 List of schools in Kanpur
 Delhi Public School, Azaad Nagar
 DPS Barra

References

External links 
 
 DPS Family Official Website

Primary schools in Uttar Pradesh
Delhi Public School Society
Schools in Kanpur
1996 establishments in Uttar Pradesh